Mona Juul (born 10 April 1959) is an official in the Norwegian Ministry of Foreign Affairs and former politician for the Labour Party. Juul hails from Sparbu, and was educated in political science. She played a key role facilitating the Oslo Accords in the 1990s. On 25 July 2019, Juul was elected President of the United Nations Economic and Social Council.

Oslo Accords 

Along with her husband Terje Rød-Larsen, Juul played a key role in the 1990s Oslo Accords—pivotal agreements on Middle East peace. The secret negotiations, largely arranged and facilitated by Juul and her husband, led to the peace agreement signing on September 13, 1993 in Washington D.C., of the first-ever  agreement between Israel and the Palestine Liberation Organization (PLO).Jones, Chris, "'Argo' and the new play 'Oslo' are stories about heroes nobody knows," April 21, 2017, Chicago Tribune retrieved May 6, 2017Rogers, J.T. (playwright), Theater: "'Oslo' and the Drama in Diplomacy", June 17, 2016, The New York Times retrieved May 6, 2017

Juul and the rest of the Oslo team of facilitators focused on the conflict between Israel and the PLO, knowing that a peace agreement would have to be created by the adversaries themselves and that a group acting as mediator would be vital in making appropriate arrangements for negotiations.

The 2016 Broadway play, Oslo'' by noted playwright J. T. Rogers, is a widely praised dramatization of the previously unheralded role of Juul and her husband, and others, in developing the back-channel communications that (reportedly) saved the Oslo negotiations from collapsing.

21st century career 
During the first cabinet Stoltenberg, from 2000 to 2001, Juul was appointed State Secretary in the Ministry of Foreign Affairs. From 2001 to 2004 she served as the Norwegian ambassador to Israel. Since 2005 she serves as deputy director and ambassador in the Norwegian delegation to the United Nations in New York City. On September 1, 2014 she succeeded Kim Traavik as Ambassador to the United Kingdom.

References

External links
The Steinkjer encyclopedia

1959 births
Living people
Ambassadors of Norway to Israel
Ambassadors of Norway to the United Kingdom
Israeli–Palestinian peace process
Labour Party (Norway) politicians
Norwegian state secretaries
People from Steinkjer
Norwegian women ambassadors
Permanent Representatives of Norway to the United Nations
20th-century Norwegian women politicians
21st-century Norwegian women politicians